The Alabama College of Osteopathic Medicine (ACOM) is a private, non-profit medical school located in the city of Dothan in the U.S. state of Alabama. It is the first osteopathic medical school in the state and is believed to be the first osteopathic medical school in the nation established by a regional not-for-profit hospital.

On April 24, 2017, the American Osteopathic Association's Commission on Osteopathic College Accreditation (COCA), awarded ACOM full accreditation status. Graduates of the college receive a Doctor of Osteopathic Medicine degree (D.O.). The first class began study on 5 August 2013, and graduated on 13 May 2017.

History
Alabama College of Osteopathic Medicine opened for courses in 2013. It was the third medical school in Alabama. In 2017, ACOM hosted its first community health fair. In May 2019, a walking trail opened near campus, connecting the medical school with local retail developments. In September 2019, ACOM established an internal medicine and pediatrics clinic in Ashford, Alabama.

Academics
Like many other medical schools in the United States, ACOM students will take basic science classes in the first two years of medical school, and move on to clinical clerkships during their third and fourth years. Twenty students per year complete rotations at Jackson Hospital in Montgomery.
Students rotate throughout Northern Florida in Pensacola, Tallahassee, and Panama City. The school is currently aiding in the establishment of residency programs in the state of Alabama.

The medical school offers two dual degrees: a Master of Science in Management (MSM) Program and a Masters in Business Administration. Both are offered via Troy University at Dothan. A team of second-year students from the Alabama College of Osteopathic Medicine (ACOM) won the International SimChallenge in Paris, France at the Society in Europe for the Simulation Applied to Medicine (SESAM) annual meeting held June 14–16, 2017.

See also
 List of medical schools in the United States

References

External links
 Alabama College of Osteopathic Medicine Official Website
 Southeast Alabama Medical Center: ACOM page
 AMEC Official Website

Educational institutions established in 2010
Osteopathic medical schools in the United States
Medical schools in Alabama
Private universities and colleges in Alabama
2010 establishments in Alabama